A Fortune deity is a deity associated with fortune, luck and wealth in mythology.

Hinduism 

 Lakshmi: Goddess of wealth, fortune and luck.
 Kubera: God of wealth.
 Ganesha: God of wisdom, luck and good beginnings; associated with wealth and fortune.
 Alakshmi: Goddess of misfortune.
 Jyestha: Goddess of inauspicious things and misfortune.

Tai folk religion  
 Nang Kwak: Goddess of wealth, fortune and luck
 Phosop: Goddess of wealth
 Mae ya nang (แม่ย่านาง) : Goddess of  luck and good beginnings; associated with wealth and fortune.
 Phra phum chaiya mongkol (พระภูมิชัยมงคล) :
 Phra Nang phum chaiya ( wife of Phra phum chaiya mongkol ) (พระนางภูมิไชยา) :

Chinese Folk Religion  and  Taoism 
 Caishen 
  Zhao Gongming 
 Bi Gan  
 The five Caishen of all directions(五路神)
 Goddess QianmuCaishen ( 錢母財神 ) 
 Goddess Wuji caishenye (無極財神爺)

Mahayana   
 Śrīmahādevī 
 Vaiśravaṇa
  Benzaiten
 Kangiten

Vajrayana   
 Vasudhara 
 Jambhala 
 Palden Lhamo

Burmese folk religion   
 Thurathadi

Shinto    
 Seven Lucky Gods

Vietnamese folk religion 
 Thần Tài
 Bà Chúa Kho

Roman Mythology 
 Fortuna

Greek Mythology 
 Tyche

External links

Fortune